Agimat: Ang Mga Alamat ni Ramon Revilla presents Elias Paniki, more popularly known as simply Elias Paniki was the fourth installment of the Philippine weekly mini-series Agimat: Ang Mga Alamat ni Ramon Revilla aired by ABS-CBN that started on May 29, 2010, and concluded on August 21, 2010. The character of Elias Paniki is portrayed by Jake Cuenca.

Overview

Original film
Agimat: Ang mga Alamat ni Ramon Revilla presents Elias Paniki is a TV adaptation of a film entitled Ang Mahiwagang Daigdig ni Elias Paniki ("The Enchanting World of Elias the Bat"), a film which starred Ramon Revilla, Sr. as the title role.

Story content
Armando was the father of Elias. Elias' mother died the night she gave birth to Elias to live with his foster parents. Elias takes mixed martial arts: Muay Thai training by a soldier named Victor, is given an amulet with extraordinary powers, the "bertud ng paniki." He uses the amulet to fight off the wicked witches and warlocks (mangkukulam) are immortal, ageless, and undying, who is feared to have returned.

Cast

Main cast
 Jake Cuenca as Elias/Armando
 Sam Pinto as Amanda 
 Kelly Misa as Raya
 Xian Lim as Gabriel
 Hermes Bautista as Migs
 Baron Geisler as Alexander
 Cherry Pie Picache as Maria
 Jojit Lorenzo as Nando
 Cheska Billones as Sandy
 Jerry O' Hara as Narcing

Guest cast
 Ronnie Lazaro as Victor
 Jairus Aquino as Young Elias
 Kath Mendoza as Young Amanda
 Adrianna Agcaoili as Eliza

See also
 Agimat: Ang Mga Alamat ni Ramon Revilla

References

External links

ABS-CBN drama series
2010 Philippine television series debuts
2010 Philippine television series endings
Television series by Dreamscape Entertainment Television
Filipino-language television shows